The 1935 World Table Tennis Championships men's singles was the ninth edition of the men's singles championship. 

Viktor Barna defeated Miklós Szabados  in the final, winning three sets to two to secure a fourth consecutive title.

Results

See also
List of World Table Tennis Championships medalists

References

-